Allocasuarina dielsiana, commonly known as the Northern sheoak, is a tree of the genus Allocasuarina native to the Mid West and Goldfields-Esperance regions of Western Australia.

It is found in stony red soils over granite in hilly country.

The species was first described as Casuarina dielsiana by the botanist Charles Austin Gardner in 1936 in the Journal of the Royal Society of Western Australia. It was subsequently reclassified into the Allocasuarina genera by Lawrence Alexander Sidney Johnson in 1982 in a revision of the sheoaks published in the Journal of the Adelaide Botanic Gardens.

References

dielsiana
Rosids of Western Australia
Fagales of Australia
Plants described in 1982
Dioecious plants